"Bristol Broadcasting Company" is a radio station chain operating 29 stations in four Southern United States markets: the Tri-Cities area of upper-east Tennessee and southwest Virginia (receiving its name from the twin cities of Bristol, Virginia and Bristol, Tennessee), Marion, Virginia, Paducah, Kentucky, and Charleston, West Virginia.

In each market it operates a country music station with a rabbit mascot and the slogan "24 carrot country", a Top 40/CHR station under the title "Electric",  and every News/Talk station carries the name "Super Talk".

Stations owned by Bristol Broadcasting

Tri-Cities
WAEZ
WEXX
WFHG-FM
WLNQ
WNPC
WWTB
WXBQ-FM

Marion
WHNK
WMEV-FM
WOLD-FM
WUKZ
WZVA

Charleston
WEMM-FM
WQBE-FM
WVSR-FM
WBES
WVTS
WYNL
WYSN

Paducah / Mayfield
WDXR
WDDJ
WKYQ
WKYX
WKYX-FM
WLLE
WNGO
WPAD
WZYK

Sevierville
WSEV

Recent acquisitions
August 2016, Bristol acquired Marion, Virginia-based stations WUKZ, W266BM and WMEV-FM.

References

External links
Company Website

Companies based in Virginia
Radio broadcasting companies of the United States